Denis Johansson (8 April 1928 – 17 January 1991) was a Finnish middle-distance runner. He competed in the 1500 metres at the 1948 Summer Olympics and the 1952 Summer Olympics.

References

1928 births
1991 deaths
Athletes (track and field) at the 1948 Summer Olympics
Athletes (track and field) at the 1952 Summer Olympics
Finnish male middle-distance runners
Olympic athletes of Finland
Place of birth missing